Olaeta is a village that is part of the municipality of Aramaio, in Álava, Basque Country, Spain.

Populated places in Álava